2nd Gnezdilovo or Vtoroye Gnezdilovo is a rural locality in Soldatsky Selsoviet Rural Settlement, Fatezhsky District, Kursk Oblast, Russia. Population:

Geography 
The village is located on the Ruda River (a link tributary of the Usozha in the basin of the Svapa), 83 km from the Russia–Ukraine border, 47 km north-west of Kursk, 23 km (34 km by road) south-west of the district center – the town Fatezh, 16.5 km from the selsoviet center – Soldatskoye. There are no streets with titles.

 Climate
2nd Gnezdilovo has a warm-summer humid continental climate (Dfb in the Köppen climate classification).

Transport 
2nd Gnezdilovo is located 22 km from the federal route  Crimea Highway as part of the European route E105, 16.5 km from the road of regional importance  (Fatezh – Dmitriyev), 13 km from the road  (Konyshyovka – Zhigayevo – 38K-038), 3 km from the road of intermunicipal significance  (38K-038 – Soldatskoye – Shuklino), 21.5 km from the nearest railway halt 552 km (railway line Navlya – Lgov-Kiyevsky).

The rural locality is situated 51 km from Kursk Vostochny Airport, 159 km from Belgorod International Airport and 249 km from Voronezh Peter the Great Airport.

References

Notes

External links 
 2nd Gnezdilovo on komandirovka.ru

Sources

Rural localities in Fatezhsky District